The 2012 Big Ten Conference football season was the 117th season for the Big Ten. The conference began its season on September 1, as each of the conference's teams began their respective 2012 season of NCAA Division I Football Bowl Subdivision competition. This was the league's second season with a divisional format and a championship game.

Rankings

Spring games
April 14
Illinois
Indiana
Iowa
Michigan
Nebraska (canceled)
Northwestern
Purdue

April 21
Minnesota
Ohio State
Penn State

April 28
Michigan State
Wisconsin

Schedule

All times Eastern time.

Rankings = AP / Coaches.

Week 1

Week 2

Week 3

Week 4

Week 5

Week 6

Week 7

Week 8

Week 9

Week 10

Week 11

Week 12

Week 13

Week 14 – Big Ten Championship Game

Homecoming games
September 29
Minnesota @ Iowa (Iowa's record in homecoming games is 54-41-5)
Wisconsin @ Nebraska 7 pm CT ABC, ESPN, or ESPN2 (Nebraska's record in homecoming games is 75-22-4)

October 6
Michigan State @ Indiana (Indiana's record in homecoming games is 44-49-6)
Nebraska @ Ohio State 8 pm ET ABC, ESPN, or ESPN2
Northwestern @ Penn State (Penn State's record in homecoming games is 66-21-5)

October 13
Illinois @ Michigan (Michigan's record in homecoming games is 84-27)
Iowa @ Michigan State (Michigan State's record in homecoming games is 63-30-3)
Northwestern @ Minnesota
Wisconsin @ Purdue (Purdue's record in homecoming games is 50-35-4)

October 27
Indiana @ Illinois (Illinois' record in homecoming games is 44-55-2)
Iowa @ Northwestern
Michigan State @ Wisconsin

Bowl games
The Big Ten has agreements with the following bowls:

Two name changes for Big Ten bowls this year.  The Buffalo Wild Wings Bowl used to be known as the Insight Bowl and the Heart of Dallas Bowl used to be known as the TicketCity Bowl.

With only seven bowl eligible teams, the Big Ten is unable to place a team in the eighth bowl game they are contracted with, the Little Caesars Pizza Bowl.

2013 NFL Draft

Records against FBS conferences
2012 records against FBS conferences:

Through January 1, 2013

Players of the week

Players of the Year

All-Conference Players
Coaches All-Conference Selections 

HONORABLE MENTION: Illinois: Akeem Spence; Indiana: Ted Bolser, Dan Feeney, Cody Latimer, Jason Spriggs; Iowa: C.J. Fiedorowicz, Anthony Hitchens, Mike Meyer, Matt Tobin; Michigan: J.T. Floyd, Jeremy Gallon, Brendan Gibbons, Will Hagerup, Roy Roundtree, Jake Ryan; Michigan State: Denicos Allen, William Gholston, Isaiah Lewis, Chris McDonald, Marcus Rush; Minnesota: Michael Carter; Nebraska: Ben Cotton, Ciante Evans, Justin Jackson, P.J. Smith; Northwestern: Ibraheim Campbell, Brian Mulroe, Tyler Scott, Patrick Ward; Ohio State: C.J. Barnett, Travis Howard, Corey Linsley, Jack Mewhort, Andrew Norwell; Penn State: Adrian Amos, Deion Barnes, Kyle Carter, Mike Farrell, Matt McGloin, Stephon Morris; Purdue: Antavian Edison, Josh Johnson, Cody Webster; Wisconsin: Beau Allen, Marcus Cromartie, Travis Frederick, David Gilbert, Ethan Hemer, Drew Meyer, Devin Smith, Dezmen Southward, Mike Taylor

There was a tie among the Coaches for the Offensive Guard honor, so three players received the first team honor and only one on the second team.  Coaches also selected three second-team running backs and three second-team defensive linemen.

Media All-Conference Selections

HONORABLE MENTION: Illinois: Jonathan Brown, Michael Buchanan, Terry Hawthorne, Graham Pocic, Akeem Spence, Hugh Thornton; Indiana: Ted Bolser, Mitch Ewald, Dan Feeney, Greg Heban, Will Matte, Jason Spriggs, Shane Wynn; Iowa: C.J. Fiedorowicz, James Ferentz, Joe Gaglione, Anthony Hitchens, Mike Meyer, James Morris; Michigan: William Campbell, J.T. Floyd, Devin Funchess, Jeremy Gallon, Brendan Gibbons, Jordan Kovacs, Patrick Omameh, Denard Robinson, Craig Roh, Roy Roundtree; Michigan State: Denicos Allen, Isaiah Lewis, Chris McDonald, Marcus Rush; Minnesota: Michael Carter, Ra'Shede Hageman, Troy Stoudermire; Nebraska: Ameer Abdullah, Will Compton, Ben Cotton, Ciante Evans, Justin Jackson, Brett Maher (punter), Kyler Reed, P.J. Smith, Baker Steinkuhler; Northwestern: Chi Chi Ariguzo, Ibraheim Campbell, Kain Colter, David Nwabuisi, Damien Proby, Tyler Scott, Patrick Ward; Ohio State: C.J. Barnett, Corey Brown, Christian Bryant, Reid Fragel, Corey Linsley, Etienne Sabino; Penn State: Adrian Amos, Deion Barnes, Mike Farrell, Matt McGloin, Stephon Morris, Sean Stanley, Zach Zwinak; Purdue: Ricardo Allen, Antavian Edison, Landon Feichter, Cody Webster; Wisconsin: Beau Allen, Chris Borland, Marcus Cromartie, David Gilbet, Ryan Groy, Drew Meyer, Jacob Pedersen, Dezmen Southward

First Team All-Americans
There are many outlets that award All-America honors in football.  The NCAA uses five official selectors to also determine Consensus and Unanimous All-America honors.  The five teams used by the NCAA to compile the consensus team are from the Associated Press, the AFCA, the FWAA, The Sporting News and the Walter Camp Football Foundation.  A point system is used to calculate the consensus honors.  The point system consists of three points for first team, two points for second team and three points for third team. No honorable mention or fourth team or lower are used in the computation.

The teams are compiled by position and the player accumulating the most points at each position is named a Consensus All-American. If there is a tie at a position in football for first team then the players who are tied shall be named to the team.  A player named first-team by all five of the NCAA-recognized selectors is recognized as a Unanimous All-American.

Academic All-Americans
The following players were first team Academic All-Americans: Rex Burkhead (NEB), Patrick Ward (NW), and Pete Massaro (PSU) all repeated from the 2011 first team. John Urschel (PSU) and Adam Replogle (IND) were also first team selections.

National Award Winners
 Montee Ball, Wisconsin – Doak Walker Award

Attendance

Head coaches

 Tim Beckman, Illinois
 Kevin R. Wilson, Indiana
 Kirk Ferentz, Iowa
 Brady Hoke, Michigan
 Mark Dantonio, Michigan State
 Jerry Kill, Minnesota

 Bo Pelini, Nebraska
 Pat Fitzgerald, Northwestern
 Urban Meyer, Ohio State
 Bill O'Brien, Penn State
 Danny Hope, Purdue
 Bret Bielema, Wisconsin

Notes

References